Parombo is a town in the West Nile sub-region of the Northern Region of Uganda.

Location
Parombo is located in Padyere County, Parombo Town Council, in Nebbi District, in northwestern Uganda. The geographical coordinates of Parombo are:02°18'13.0"N, 31°12'11.0"E (Latitude:2.303611; Longitude:31.203056).

Overview 
Parombo is divided into six administrative divisions; namely (a) Parwo (b) Pagwata (c) Ossi (d) Padel (e) Pangarere and (f) Pulum.
The growing urban area has a town board.

Population
The national population census and household survey, carried out on 27 August 2014, enumerated the population of Parombo Subcounty at 41,286 people. This population is mainly rural and the urban centre is a much smaller fraction of the sub-county. The majority of inhabitants of the sub-county and the town are the Alur people.

Challenges
Two of the most challenging issues for Parombo are water scarcity and poor sanitation. The water crisis in Parombo and surrounding communities dates back for nearly two decades. The town and surrounding areas have protected springs, shallow wells and boreholes from which they collect water for animal and human use. But these infrastructure developments do not meet all the area's water needs.

In 2018, National Water and Sewerage Corporation (NWSC) was tasked to establish a piped water system in Parombo Town Council and in the surrounding communities. Work is continuing, although initial attempts to locate a suitable water source have been unsuccessful.

Due to the absence of a centralized sewerage disposal system, sanitation remains a challenge as sometimes sewage contaminates water sources for human consumption, as happened at Parombo Secondary School in March 2019.

References

External links
 Voting opposition is waste of time, says Museveni As of 10 July 2019.

Populated places in Northern Region, Uganda
West Nile sub-region
Nebbi District